Gandon is a surname. Notable people with the surname include:

James Gandon (1743–1823), English architect who worked in Ireland
Nick Gandon (born 1956), English cricketer
Pierre Gandon (1899–1990), French illustrator and engraver